Rhynchelmis is the genus of 30 species of aquatic oligochaetes from the Northern Hemisphere, with 11 species from North America and 19 from Eurasia. They are part of the family Lumbriculidae, which are among the largest of the microdriles. They are generally defined as having atria in segment X and spermathecae in segment VIII (Fend & Brinkhurst, 2000). The prostomium generally has a proboscis, from which the genus has got its name.

Rhynchelmis contains several subgenera, all of which have previously held genus rank: Rhynchelmoides with four species, Sutroa with six species, and Pseudorhynchelmis with nine species. Further, four species - Rh. aleutensis, Rh. brooksi, Rh. malevici and Rh. orientalis - cannot positively be placed in any of the subgenera.

References
 Fend, S. V. & Brinkhurst, R. O. (2000): New species of Rhynchelmis (Clitellata, Lumbriculidae), with observations on the Nearctic species. Hydrobiologia 428: 1-59.

Lumbriculidae
Annelid genera